The Association of Track and Field Statisticians (ATFS) was founded in 1950. It is an international organization run by volunteers whose goal is to collect and disseminate the statistics of track and field athletics.

Foundation 

On 26 August 1950 at the Café de la Madeleine in the Rue de la Montagne, Brussels, Belgium, whilst attending the 1950 European Athletics Championships, the Association of Track and Field Statisticians was founded.

Two of the founding members, Roberto Quercetani and Donald Potts, had published in 1948 the first study of world all-time lists, A Handbook on Olympic Games Track and Field Athletics. Readers of this book were inspired to found an international association of track statisticians. One of the founding members, the Belgian journalist André Greuze, organised the first meeting on 26 August. One of the meeting's first acts was to elect Harold Abrahams as honorary  president.

Founding members 

 President: Roberto Quercetani (Italy)
 Secretary: Fulvio Regli (Switzerland)
 Committee: Norris McWhirter (UK), Donald Potts (USA)
 Members: Harold Abrahams (UK) - Hon. President, Bruno Bonomelli (Italy), André Greuze (Belgium), Erich Kamper (Austria), Ekkehard zur Megede (Germany), André Senay (France), Björn-Johan Weckman (Finland), Wolfgang Wünsche (Germany)

Note: two of the founders, Potts and Wünsche, were not actually present at the first meeting but are considered as founding members.

Yearbook 

The association has published an annual yearbook since 1951. The first edition was published in Lugano, Switzerland, titled The 1951 A.T.F.S. International Athletic Annual. The editors were Fulvio Regli and Roberto Quercetani. It is an authoritative compilation of international athletics statistics and has been known as The International Athletics Annual and The ATFS Annual. It is currently published under the title of Athletics: The International Track and Field Annual and its editor is Peter Matthews.

Roberto Quercetani 

Roberto Luigi Quercetani (known as RLQ to other track and field statisticians)was one of the eleven founding members of ATFS and was also its first president, remaining in the position for 18 years. He was also the editor of the first ATFS Annual. and is a renowned historian and writer on athletics

Quercetani was born in Florence, Italy on May 3, 1922. He was interested in both foreign languages and athletics from an early age, his study in both helped by reading foreign newspapers sent by friends from Switzerland. After World War II, he served as a technical interpreter for the allied forces in Italy. Now fluent in English, French and German, he started writing articles for the foreign sporting publications Leichathletik of Germany, World Sports of the UK, and Track and Field News of the United States.

In 1948, he wrote his first athletics statistical publication (with Don Potts).

From 1951, Quercetani started as a long-time contributor to the Italian newspapers La Gazzetta dello Sport and La Nazione.

In 1964 his first of many books on athletics was published: A World History of Track and Field Athletics 1864-1964. He has since added a number of titles that cover the history of most of the events of athletics.

In 1994, he was founder member, and president until 1998, of the Archivo Storico Dell'Atletica Italiana "Bruno Bonomelli", an Italian non-profit-making cultural association dedicated to the history of Italian athletics.

In 2010, under the chairmanship of Mel Watman, Quercetani was invited, as an acknowledged industry expert, to help write the book to celebrate the 2012 centenary of the governing body of athletics, the IAAF.

In 2012, in acknowledgement of his life's achievements, Quercetani was awarded by the IAAF the IAAF Veteran Pin, their most important award.

Quercetani died on May 13, 2019 at the age of 97. He was survived by his wife Maria Luisa.

Don Potts 

Donald H. Potts was born December 13, 1921. A degree in physics and a doctorate in mathematics led to a creer in industry and academia, including being professor of mathematics at Cal State Northridge from 1965 to 1991.

An avid track fan from a young age, he and Roberto Quercetani compiled from 1948 the renowned annual world rankings in Track and Field News.

He was a co-founder of ATFS and of the Federation of American Statisticians of Track (with Scott Davis and Stan Eales).

He died November 1, 2001 in Santa Barbara, California.

Executive committee members (until 2016) 
 President: Paul Jenes (Australia)
 Vice President: A. Lennart Julin (Sweden)
 Treasurer: Tom Casacky (United States)
 Secretary: Michael McLaughlin (Australia)
 Committee members: Roberto Quercetani (Italy), Rooney Magnusson (Sweden), Bernard Linley (Trinidad and Tobago), Peter Matthews (UK), Yves Pinaud (France), Riel Hauman (South Africa), Yoshimasa Noguchi (Japan), Eduardo Biscayart (United States), Giuseppe Mappa (Italy), Nejat Kök (Turkey)

Executive committee members (2021) 
 Secretary: Michael McLaughlin (Australia)

References

External links 
  ATFS older website that is still active
 ATFS website

List of sports history organisations

Statistical societies
Track and Field books
Track and field organizations